The Asia/Oceania Zone was one of three zones of regional competition in the 2004 Davis Cup.

Group I

New Zealand relegated to Group II in 2005.
Thailand and Japan advance to World Group Play-off.

Group II

Malaysia and Hong Kong relegated to Group III in 2005.
China promoted to Group I in 2005.

Group III
Venue: Phu Tho Tennis Centre, Ho Chi Minh City, Vietnam (hard)
Date: 5–11 April

(scores in italics carried over from Groups)

{{4TeamRR
| title=1st–4th Play-off
| team-1-abbrev=KAZ
| team-1=''' (3–0)
| team-2-abbrev=POC
| team-2=

Kazakhstan and Pacific Oceania promoted to Group II in 2005.
Oman and Syria relegated to Group IV in 2005.

Group IV
Venue: Al Hussein Sport City, Amman, Jordan (hard)
Date: 5–11 April

Saudi Arabia and Sri Lanka promoted to Group III in 2005.

See also
Davis Cup structure

 
Asia
Davis Cup Asia/Oceania Zone